TRT 4K, is an UHD television channel established by TRT on Türksat 3A. TRT 4K started test broadcasting February 19, 2015. TRT4K is the first UHD FTA TV channel in Turkey and Europe. TRT4K uses HEVC (H.265) codec with 4K Ultra HD resolution 3840×2160 and 50 progressive (full) frame rate with hybrid log-gamma HDR. Audio codec is Dolby Digital (E-AC-3). (Surround 7.1 Sound reinforcement system Turkish). Some live events were broadcast from TRT 4K like UEFA Champions League, UEFA European Championship etc.

References 

Turkish Radio and Television Corporation
Television stations in Turkey
Television channels and stations established in 2015
2015 establishments in Turkey
4K television channels